Rear Admiral Davyd Rhys Thomas,  (born 2 May 1956) is a senior officer in the Royal Australian Naval Reserve.

Naval career
Davyd Rhys Thomas was born on 2 May 1956 in Newcastle, New South Wales, and joined the Royal Australian Navy College from that city in 1974. After gaining a Bridge Watchkeeping Certificate in 1978, he served as executive officer of HMAS Aware, a Darwin-based patrol boat.

Thomas was promoted to lieutenant in 1979, during which time he commenced his warfare training, and served on HMAS Brisbane. A short stint on the staff at the RAN Apprentice Training Establishment, prior to professional warfare specialist training in the United Kingdom, followed in 1983.

Upon his return to Australia, Thomas served as the operations officer on HMAS Vampire, and later on HMAS Perth as Gunnery Officer. He then completed the RAN Staff Course in 1987, and was subsequently employed as the surface weapons trials officer at the RAN's Test and Evaluation Centre in Sydney.

Thomas was then posted as executive officer of HMAS Adelaide, and participated in the first RAN contingent to the Persian Gulf in 1990, as part of Operation Desert Shield; he was promoted to commander in December 1990.

He then served in Western Australia as the operations officer at Fleet Base West. In September 1994, Thomas assumed command of HMAS Darwin, based on the West Coast.

In the Australia Day Honour's List of 1997, Thomas was awarded the Conspicuous Service Cross and was promoted to captain in July of the same year. March 1999 saw him posted as Director of Naval Officers' Postings, until assuming command of HMAS Newcastle in March 2001.

As the commanding officer of Newcastle during Operation Slipper in the Persian Gulf, Thomas conducted maritime interdiction in support of coalition forces enforcing United Nations sanctions against Iraq. For this he was awarded a Commendation for Distinguished Service in June 2003.

He was promoted to the rank of commodore and made a Member of the Order of Australia in mid-2002 for "exceptional service to the Royal Australian Navy". He later assumed the position of Commodore Flotillas and Commander Deployable Joint Force Headquarters (Maritime) in February 2004.

Thomas was promoted to rear admiral and appointed to the position of Maritime Commander Australia (MCAUST) in July 2005; in 2007 this position was renamed Commander Australian Fleet (COMAUSFLT).

On 3 August 2007, Thomas assumed command of the Australian Defence College, which on 14 January 2008 became Joint Education, Training and Warfare (JETW) Command (which encompasses the Australian Defence College Headquarters, the Australian Defence Force Academy, the Australian Command and Staff College, the Centre for Defence and Strategic Studies and the ADF Warfare Centre).

Thomas assumed the duties of Deputy Chief of Navy (DCN) on 6 June 2008. In the Australia Day Honours List of 2009, Thomas was appointed an Officer of the Order of Australia for his service as Commodore Flotillas, Maritime Commander Australia, Commander Australian Fleet and Commander, Australian Defence College. He relinquished the post of DCN on 18 February 2011 to Rear Admiral Trevor Jones.

Honours and awards

References

External links
Official Biography
Official photo (copyright)

1956 births
Military personnel from New South Wales
Australian military personnel of the Gulf War
Australian military personnel of the War in Afghanistan (2001–2021)
Commanders Australian Fleet
Deputy Chiefs of Navy (Australia)
Living people
Officers of the Order of Australia
People from Newcastle, New South Wales
Recipients of the Commendation for Distinguished Service
Recipients of the Conspicuous Service Cross (Australia)
Royal Australian Navy admirals